Daniel Aráoz (born 6 September 1962) is an Argentine actor. He appeared in more than thirty films since 1985.

Selected filmography

Awards
 Silver Condor Award for Best Actor (2011)

References

External links 

1962 births
Living people
Argentine male film actors